An election to Edinburgh Corporation was held on 4 May 1971, alongside municipal elections across Scotland. Of the council's 68 seats, 23 were up for election.

Following the election, Edinburgh Corporation was composed of 28 Labour councillors, 27 Progressives, 9 Conservatives, 3 Liberals, and 2 independents. The SNP was wiped off the council after lost all five of the seats it was defending.

Following the election, the Progressives and Conservative coalition retained controlled of the council with a majority of three seats.

A total of 125,045 residents voted.

Aggregate results

Ward Results

References

1971
1971 Scottish local elections